Nizhniye Khomyaki is a rural locality (a village) in Vereshchaginskoye Urban Settlement, Vereshchaginsky District, Perm Krai, Russia. The population was 5 as of 2010.

Geography 
Nizhniye Khomyaki is located 6 km south of Vereshchagino (the district's administrative centre) by road. Subbotniki is the nearest rural locality.

References 

Rural localities in Vereshchaginsky District